Music Theory Spectrum is a peer-reviewed, academic journal specializing in music theory and analysis. It is the official journal of the Society for Music Theory, and is published by Oxford University Press. The journal was first published in 1979 as the official organ of the Society for Music Theory, which had been founded in 1977 and had its first conference in 1978. Unlike many other journals (music or otherwise), Music Theory Spectrum was initially published in an oblong (landscape) page format, to better accommodate such musical graphics as Schenkerian graphs.

Published twice annually, Music Theory Spectrum includes research articles and book reviews. Online access to back issues of the journal up 2017 is provided through JSTOR. In a 1999 study, it was the seventh most frequently cited journal in music theses overall, and the third most frequently cited journal in music theory theses.

In Spring 2014, Oxford University Press began publishing Music Theory Spectrum, beginning with Volume 36, Issue 1. It replaced the University of California Press.

Music Theory Spectrum is currently edited by Marianne Wheeldon. Its first editor was Bryan Simms, and other past editors have included Severine Neff, Joel Lester, Philip Lambert, Daniel Harrison, and Henry Klumpenhouwer.

References

External links
  Society for Music Theory official website
  Music Theory Spectrum on University of California Press Journals website

Music theory journals
Oxford University Press academic journals
English-language journals
Biannual journals
Publications established in 1979